Weightlifting at the 1968 Summer Paralympics consisted of four events for men held 07 – 12 November 1968.

Participating nations 
There were 28 male competitors representing 13 nations.

Medal summary

Medal table 
There were 12 medal winners representing nine nations.

Men's events

References 

 

1968 Summer Paralympics events
1968
Paralympics